The Chesterfield County Government Complex is the headquarters for the Chesterfield County, Virginia local government. Located in Chesterfield, Virginia, it is the meeting place of the Chesterfield County Board of Supervisors. It also houses the offices of the Chesterfield County's bureaucratic agencies.

The complex is bound by the historic Chesterfield County Courthouse and Courthouse Square. Major facilities on the complex include the county's Police Department headquarters and central police station, offices for the county's fire and EMS services, and social services.

References 

County government buildings in Virginia
Buildings and structures in Chesterfield County, Virginia
Legislative buildings